The women's 100 metres event at the 2015 Summer Universiade was held on 8 and 9 July at the Gwangju Universiade Main Stadium.

Medalists

Results

Heats
Qualification: First 3 in each heat (Q) and next 6 fastest (q) qualified for the semifinals.

Wind:Heat 1: +0.4 m/s, Heat 2: +0.6 m/s, Heat 3: +0.5 m/s, Heat 4: +0.3 m/s, Heat 5: +0.1 m/s, Heat 6: +0.1 m/s

Semifinals
Qualification: First 2 in each heat (Q) and the next 2 fastest (q) qualified for the final.

Wind:Heat 1: +1.3 m/s, Heat 2: +1.6 m/s, Heat 3: +1.8 m/s

Final
Wind: +0.4 m/s

References

100
2015 in women's athletics
2015